Charles Franklin "Whitey" Glazner (September 17, 1893 – June 6, 1989) was a professional baseball player.  He was a right-handed pitcher over parts of five seasons (1920–24) with the Pittsburgh Pirates, and Philadelphia Phillies.  For his career, he compiled a 41–48 record, with a 4.21 earned run average, and 266 strikeouts in  innings pitched.

He was born in Sycamore, Alabama, and died in Orlando, Florida, at the age of 95.

References

1893 births
1989 deaths
People from Talladega County, Alabama
Pittsburgh Pirates players
Philadelphia Phillies players
Major League Baseball pitchers
Baseball players from Alabama
Birmingham Barons players
Los Angeles Angels (minor league) players
Mobile Bears players
Dallas Steers players
New Orleans Pelicans (baseball) players